Rastislav or Rostislav may refer to:

People
Rostislav (given name), a Slavic male given name

Royalty
Rastislav (died 9th-century), second ruler of Great Moravia 846–870
Rostislav of Tmutarakan (1038–1066)
Rostislav Vsevolodovich (1070–1093), Prince of Pereyaslavl 1078–1093
Rostislav I of Kiev (Rostislav Mstislavich, 1110–1167), Grand Prince of Kiev from 1154–1167, with intervals
Rostislav II of Kiev (Rostislav Rurikovich, 1173–13th-century), Grand Prince of Kiev from 1204–1206
Rostislav III of Kiev (Rostislav Mikhailovich or Rostislav of Slavonia), Grand Prince of Kiev in 1239
Rastislav Nemanjić (Rastko, 1174–1235), Grand Prince of Hum 1190–1192, Serb Archbishop 1217–1235
Rastislalić family, 14th-century Serbian noble family

Other
Russian ship Rostislav, two ships of the Imperial Russian Navy
Prince Rostislav (Rachmaninoff), a symphonic poem by Sergei Rachmaninoff